Newton under Roseberry is a village in the borough of Redcar and Cleveland and the ceremonial county of North Yorkshire, England.  It is on the A173, between Great Ayton and Guisborough and is close to the base of Roseberry Topping.

The village is situated near the edge of the North York Moors National Park, and also close to the border of Redcar and Cleveland with Middlesbrough and the Hambleton district of North Yorkshire.

In popular culture
A reference to Newton under Roseberry was featured in the folk-rock group America's "Hat Trick" from the Hat Trick album.  The exact lyric stanza is: 
Newton-Under-Roseberry-Topping
And it's cold and it's wet
And you feel like you're part of all time

Religion

The Anglican church of St Oswald's is a Grade II* listed building, with an Anglo-Saxon carving.

References

External links

Villages in North Yorkshire
Places in the Tees Valley
Redcar and Cleveland
Guisborough